Las Maquinas de la Muerte is the third studio album by Polish rock/rapcore band Kazik Na Żywo. It was released in April 1999 in Poland through S.P. Records (CD and MC version). The album was recorded in 1998, Warsaw.

Track listing

1 - excerpt from Wojciech Jaruzelski's address to the citizens of Poland declaring the introduction of the martial law
5, 9, 15, 18, 21 - spoken skits by Tomasz Goehs and Kazik Staszewski
25 - bonus track on the CD version

Personnel
Kazik Staszewski - vocal, guitar, lyrics
Adam Burzyński - guitar
Robert Friedrich - guitar, backing vocals
Tomasz Goehs - drums, backing vocals
Michał Kwiatkowski - bass, guitar

References

1999 albums
Kazik na Żywo albums